Najima Rhozali or Najima Thay Thay Rhozali (born 1960, Oujda) is a Moroccan politician of the National Rally of Independents party. She held the position of Secretary of State for Literacy and non-formal Education in the cabinets of Driss Jettou.

Rhozali is a professor of linguistics at the university of Agadir specializing in oral tradition. She authored books on traditional folk stories and legends.

See also
Cabinet of Morocco

References

1960 births
Living people
Government ministers of Morocco
Linguists from Morocco
Moroccan writers
People from Oujda
Moroccan women writers
Women government ministers of Morocco
Socialist Union of Popular Forces politicians
21st-century Moroccan women politicians
21st-century Moroccan politicians